Austrått may refer to:

Austrått, a manor in Ørland municipality in Trøndelag county, Norway
Austrått Fort, a former coastal artillery site located in Ørland municipality in Trøndelag county, Norway
Austrått, Rogaland, a borough in the city of Sandnes in Rogaland county, Norway

See also
Inger til Austrått, a wealthy Norwegian landowner from the 1500s